The third season of the American television drama series Better Call Saul premiered on April 10, 2017, and concluded on June 19, 2017. The ten-episode season was broadcast on Monday nights in the United States on AMC. A spin-off of Breaking Bad, Better Call Saul was created by Vince Gilligan and Peter Gould, both of whom also worked on Breaking Bad.

The third season immediately follows the events of the second season, which take place in late 2002. The year is 2003 by the third season's conclusion. Bob Odenkirk reprises his role as Jimmy McGill, a lawyer who is engaged in a feud with his brother Chuck (Michael McKean), an attorney who believes Jimmy is unfit to be a lawyer and plots to have him disbarred. Jonathan Banks also reprises his role as Mike Ehrmantraut, who begins a partnership with Gustavo Fring (Giancarlo Esposito), while Nacho Varga (Michael Mando) is plotting to murder their rival, Hector Salamanca (Mark Margolis).

The third season of Better Call Saul received acclaim from critics, particularly for McKean's performance as Chuck, and the character development of Jimmy McGill, and eight nominations for the 69th Primetime Emmy Awards, including Outstanding Drama Series.

Production

Development 
In March 2016, AMC announced that Better Call Saul was renewed for a 10-episode third season which premiered April 10, 2017. 

Early in the writing stages, series co-creator and co-showrunner Vince Gilligan left the writers room to focus on new projects. This resulted in Peter Gould, who also created and developed the show, becoming the sole showrunner, a transition that had been planned since the series' beginning.

Casting 
The third season of Better Call Saul features the return of several of the original cast from Breaking Bad, most notably Giancarlo Esposito (Gus Fring), who returned in the second episode "Witness". In a Q&A with AMC, Esposito expressed excitement on his return into the Breaking Bad universe, saying, 

All of the main cast members returned for this season. Bob Odenkirk returns as Jimmy McGill, Jonathan Banks returns as Mike Ehrmantraut, Rhea Seehorn returns as Kim Wexler, Patrick Fabian returns as Howard Hamlin, Michael Mando returns as Nacho Varga, and Michael McKean returns as Chuck McGill, Jimmy's elder brother. This was the first season of Better Call Saul to feature Giancarlo Esposito as a member of the main cast.

Filming 
Better Call Saul is set and filmed in Albuquerque, New Mexico, the same location as its predecessor.

In the first scene from the first episode, Jimmy is hiding his real identity under his Gene Takavic alias while working at a Cinnabon in a shopping mall in Omaha, Nebraska. The Cinnabon scenes in Better Call Saul are set in Omaha, but filmed at the Cottonwood Mall in Albuquerque, New Mexico.

Cast and characters

Main 
 Bob Odenkirk as Jimmy McGill, a lawyer who is involved in a feud with his brother Chuck. In the present, he manages a Cinnabon store in Omaha under the alias Gene Takavic.
 Jonathan Banks as Mike Ehrmantraut, a former Philadelphia police officer, who is engaged in a feud with the Salamancas after they threatened his family.
 Rhea Seehorn as Kim Wexler, a lawyer and Jimmy's close friend and lover, who also co-founds a law firm with him.
 Patrick Fabian as Howard Hamlin, Chuck's law partner at Hamlin, Hamlin & McGill (HHM) and Jimmy's arch rival.
 Michael Mando as Nacho Varga, a member of the Salamanca drug ring, who secretly works with Mike in taking down Hector.
 Giancarlo Esposito as Gus Fring, a methamphetamine distributor who uses his fast food restaurant chain Los Pollos Hermanos as a front.
 Michael McKean as Chuck McGill, Jimmy's elder brother, who allegedly suffers from electromagnetic hypersensitivity, compelling him to avoid sources of electricity.

Recurring 
 Mark Margolis as Hector Salamanca, Tuco's uncle and the leader of the Salamanca drug ring.
 Jeremiah Bitsui as Victor, Gus's henchman, reprising his role from Breaking Bad.
 Kerry Condon as Stacey Ehrmantraut, Mike's widowed daughter-in-law and the mother of Kaylee Ehrmantraut.
 Tina Parker as Francesca Liddy, Saul's secretary, reprising her role from Breaking Bad.
 Omar Maskati as Omar, Jimmy's assistant at Davis & Main.
 Vincent Fuentes as Arturo, a criminal associate of Hector Salamanca.
 Rex Linn as Kevin Wachtell, chairman of Mesa Verde Bank and Trust and a client of HHM and Kim.
 Cara Pifko as Paige Novick, senior legal counsel for Mesa Verde Bank and Trust and a friend of Kim.
 Ann Cusack as Rebecca Bois, Chuck's ex-wife.
 Tamara Tunie as Anita, a support group member.
 Manuel Uriza as Ximenez Lecerda, an associate of Hector Salamanca.
 Josh Fadem as Camera Guy, a film student who helps Jimmy on various projects.
 Hayley Holmes as Drama Girl, a film student who helps Jimmy on various projects.
 Julian Bonfiglio as Sound Guy, a film student who helps Jimmy on various projects.
 Brandon K. Hampton as Ernesto, Chuck's assistant who works at HHM.
 Jean Effron as Irene, an elderly client of Jimmy McGill overcharged by Sandpiper Crossing.
 Joe DeRosa as Dr. Caldera, a veterinarian who serves as Mike's liaison to the criminal underworld.
 Juan Carlos Cantu as Manuel Varga, Nacho's father who is the owner of a car restoration shop.

Guest stars 
 Max Arciniega as Domingo "Krazy-8" Molina, reprising his role from Breaking Bad.
 Ray Campbell as Tyrus, reprising his role from Breaking Bad.
 Laura Fraser as Lydia Rodarte-Quayle, reprising her role from Breaking Bad.
 Lavell Crawford as Huell Babineaux, reprising his role from Breaking Bad.
 Steven Bauer as Don Eladio Vuente, reprising his role from Breaking Bad.
 Kimberly Hebert Gregory as Kyra Hay, a deputy district attorney.
 Brendan Fehr as Bauer, a military captain.
 John Getz as Chairman, a lawyer and a member of the New Mexico Bar Association.
 Mel Rodriguez as Marco Pasternak, Jimmy's friend from Cicero, Illinois.
 Clea DuVall as Dr. Lara Cruz, Chuck's doctor.
 Javier Grajeda as Juan Bolsa, a high-level member of the Juárez drug cartel that includes the Salamancas and Gus Fring, reprising his role from Breaking Bad.
 Mark Proksch as Daniel "Pryce" Wormald, a seller of pharmaceuticals and small-time drug dealer.
 Jessie Ennis as Erin Brill, an employee at Davis & Main.

Episodes

Reception

Critical response 

The third season of Better Call Saul, much like the previous two, received universal acclaim, particularly for McKean's performance as Chuck, and the character development of Jimmy McGill. On Rotten Tomatoes, the third season has an approval rating of 98% based on 175 reviews, with an average rating of 8.78/10. The site's critical consensus is: "Better Call Saul shows no signs of slipping in season 3, as the introduction of more familiar faces causes the inevitable transformation of its lead to pick up exciting speed." On the review aggregator website Metacritic, the season has a score of 87 out of 100 based on 18 critics, indicating "universal acclaim".

Terri Schwartz of IGN rated the third season 9.1/10, praising Jimmy's character development saying: "Better Call Saul was better than it's ever been in Season 3." Verne Gay of Newsday gave it an "A+" grade and wrote, "Based on the first two episodes, Saul is making a case that it could be even better than Breaking Bad."

Critics' top ten list

Ratings

Accolades

Significance

Chuck's arc 

Jimmy tries to make amends with Chuck in the season finale "Lantern", but Chuck coldly cuts ties with Jimmy, telling him that "he never really mattered all that much to him". After Chuck forces Jimmy away, his EHS symptoms begin to re-emerge, and he becomes obsessed with disabling all electronic devices in his home to the point of tearing walls open to remove the wiring. He eventually reaches a breaking point and knocks a gas lantern over, setting fire to his house. After this scene, there was much speculation as to what happened to Chuck after the fire started. Showrunner Peter Gould said, "I don't want to define anything more than what's on screen". Michael McKean, who played Chuck, told Vulture: "I got a call on my cell from Peter [Gould] [and] Vince [Gilligan]. I said, 'If this is the death call, I'm going to pull over.' And that's what I did. I pulled into the parking lot of the bookstore and I called them back and they told me what they had planned. They told me they had laughed about what I had said, but they had to deliver it". When asked if his character was dead, McKean said: "I am. I know they want to bring me in for some flashbacks this coming season, but that's kind of beside the point". As revealed in the fourth season's premiere, Howard notifies Jimmy and Kim about the fire, and they arrive at the scene just in time to see Chuck's body being taken away.

Home media 
The third season was released on Blu-ray and DVD in region 1 on January 16, 2018. The set contains all 10 episodes, plus audio commentaries for every episode and several behind-the-scenes featurettes.

International broadcast
Outside the U.S. in certain international markets, season 3 was released on Netflix with episodes available the day after the episodes were broadcast on AMC.

Related media

Talking Saul 

Talking Saul is a live aftershow hosted by Chris Hardwick, which features guests discussing episodes of Better Call Saul. These episodes discussed the third-season premiere and finale episodes of Better Call Saul.

Los Pollos Hermanos Employee Training
AMC released a series of ten short videos on YouTube and their social media accounts during season three as Los Pollos Hermanos Employee Training, combining live-action shots featuring Esposito as Gus along with animated segments, presented as employee training videos for Gus's Los Pollos Hermanos restaurant workers. The series won the Primetime Emmy Award for Outstanding Short Form Comedy or Drama Series in 2017.

No Picnic
On June 19, 2017, the night of Sauls season finale, fans were able to access the three-minute short film No Picnic, which feature the Kettlemans, who were not seen since the first season. The short, directed by Saul associate producer Jenn Carroll and written by the show's writers' assistant Ariel Levine, shows the Kettleman family organizing a picnic close to family patriarch Craig, who is seen picking up roadside litter with his fellow inmates as part of his prison sentence.

Fans were originally able to access No Picnic through Los Pollos Hermanos Employee Training, which directed fans to participate in a bingo trivia game on the show's digital and social platforms. The video was unlockable on June 12, 2017, but could not be viewed until a week later.

References

External links 
  – official site
 
 

2017 American television seasons
Season 3
Television series set in 2002
Television series set in 2003